The Cedar Street subway is a rail tunnel in Newark that allowed street cars (and later buses) access to the subterranean level of the Newark Public Service Terminal.   It was built by the Public Service Corporation in 1916, as part of the terminal building, to reduce streetcar congestion at nearby Broad and Market streets, and provided access for a number of surface lines. The tunnel starts at street level at Washington Street and extends two blocks under Cedar Street and across Broad Street.  

The subway line opened on April 30, 1916   At that time, four street car lines, which served Central Avenue, Orange, South Orange and Springfield. At its height in 1927, fourteen lines used the subway.  An inbound station stop was added inside the tunnel under Cedar Street and Broad Street on January 27, 1927, serving Kresge's Department Store. Later, across the tracks, an outbound platform was added serving McCrory's 5 & 10 store. 

In 1935, the Cedar Street subway was extended to a junction with the newly opened Newark City Subway, allowing service to extend to Newark Penn Station. 

On May 8, 1966, the last three bus lines using the Cedar Street subway, Line 62 to Perth Amboy, Line 128 to Paterson and Line 134 to New Brunswick, operated final service through the tunnel. Since the demolition of the Public Service Terminal in 1981, it has ended at a wall under Broad Street. 

In 2006, as part of the modernization of the City Subway into the Newark Light Rail, the former Cedar Street subway junction with the City Subway line was re-purposed to connect a new branch to Newark Broad Street station. The remainder of the Cedar Street subway remains closed as of 2018, although the tunnel portal and track stubs are still visible from Washington Street.

Stations

References

External links
Cedar Street Subway: Kresge's and McCrory's

Transportation buildings and structures in Essex County, New Jersey
Railroad tunnels in New Jersey